Monochamus lunifer is a species of beetle in the family Cerambycidae. It was described by Per Olof Christopher Aurivillius in 1891, originally under the genus Monohammus. It is known from Ghana.

References

Endemic fauna of Ghana
lunifer
Beetles described in 1891